David Alfonso Arellano Moraga (29 July 1901 – 3 May 1927) was a Chilean footballer and founder of the Colo Colo football club. A winger, he scored in the 1926 South American Championship (Copa América) and is considered one of the best Chilean football players in history.

Career 

Arellano was born in Santiago, Chile on 29 July 1901. His professional debut came aged 17 for Chilean football club Magallanes in 1919. In 1925 he along with other members parted from Magallanes football club to form a new club which came to be known in Chile as Colo Colo. Arellano is attributed with showcasing the bicycle kick or in Chile known as the Chilena through footballing tours that were conducted in Europe. Arellano played for the Chile national team that participated in the 1924 and 1926 editions of Copa America. In the latter, he was the top scorer, with 7 goals.

Death 
On 3 May 1927 in Valladolid, Spain while on tour with Colo Colo, David Arellano suffered peritonitis after being hit by an opposing player during a match. Shortly after the incident Arellano was brought to a nearby clinic where he would ultimately die. In his memory Colo Colo club shirts carry a black line over the main emblem as does the Estadio Monumental David Arellano.

References 

1901 births
1927 deaths
Association football forwards
Association football players who died while playing
Chile international footballers
Chilean footballers
Chilean people of Basque descent
Colo-Colo footballers
Deaths from peritonitis
Magallanes footballers
Footballers from Santiago
Sport deaths in Spain